The Alfa Romeo 2300 is a Brazilian luxury sedan that was produced by FNM from 1974 to 1978, and FNM owned by Fiat from 1978 to 1986. The general look of the new car was very similar to that of the Italian built Alfetta sedan, designed by Giuseppe Scarnati and first offered in Europe in 1972, although the Brazilian car was actually 41 centimetres (16 in) longer and 7 centimetres (2.8 in) wider than the Alfetta. Under the skin, the 2300 was based technically on the older Alfa Romeo 1900. The gear box of the 2300 was conventionally located adjacent to the engine and not (as with the Alfetta) across the rear axle. Like its Brazilian predecessor, the FNM 2000, the 2300 featured a four-cylinder twin camshaft engine, now of 2,310 cc with a claimed output of 140 hp (100 kW). A maximum speed of 170 km/h (106 mph) was claimed. In the 1985 model year leaflet the 2300 was called as "Alfa Romeo 85". This model was supposedly manufactured until November 1986, although a final 243 Alfa Romeos were built in Brazil in 1987.

As demand for ethanol-powered cars rose, a stockpile of petrol-powered 2300s built up: as a result, Alfa Romeo forced the Brazilian Alfa Romeo on European (Dutch, Swiss, and German) importers in 1981 under the designation Alfa Romeo 2300 Rio. Around 600 of the cars were shipped to The Netherlands. The cars proved nearly unsellable and severe quality issues further deteriorated Alfa Romeo's image in Central and Northern Europe, with the importers eventually being forced to buy back the majority of the cars brought over. In the Netherlands, the bought back cars were sold on to used car dealers after three years in outdoors storage; without warranties the already decaying cars caused severe damage to Alfa Romeo's already crumbling reputation. The only real value of the Rio seems to have been to provide parts for restorers of vintage Alfa Romeo 1900s.

Origin
The Alfa 2300 project was born in Italy as project 102/12. The model was ready in 1971, and was sent to Brazil for tests in 1972. It was engineered entirely in Italy, specifically for the Brazilian market, and sold under the slogan "O importado fabricado no Brasil". At the time the adoption of 4 and 6-cylinder inline and V6 engines were studied, having some models tested with those engines, but due to the oil crisis in the 70s and the Brazilian military government, import difficulties forced the factory adopt the 4-cylinder engine, from the Alfa 1900, readjusted to 2310 cc, coupled to a five-speed transmission from the 105 series.

Technical data

Notes

References
 Automobil Revue, Katalognummern 1968 bis 1973 (technical data)
 auto katalog, 1985/86 edition (ti4 data)
 https://web.archive.org/web/20111231065049/http://bestcars.uol.com.br/cpassado2/alfa-2300-1.htm
 https://web.archive.org/web/20150820114349/http://www.alfaromeo75.it/Brasiliane.html
 Alfa Romeo 2300 (IMCDb)

2300
FNM vehicles
1980s cars
Cars introduced in 1974
Sedans
Executive cars